The 2017–18 season was Hellas Verona Football Club's first season back in Serie A following the club's relegation to Serie B at the end of the 2015–16 season. Verona earned promotion back to the top-flight after finishing second in the 2016–17 Serie B. The club finished 19th and made an immediate return to the second division.

Players

Squad information

Transfers

In

Loans in

Out

Loans out

Pre-season and friendlies

Competitions

Serie A

League table

Results summary

Results by round

Matches

Coppa Italia

Statistics

Appearances and goals

|-
! colspan=14 style=background:#dcdcdc; text-align:center| Goalkeepers

|-
! colspan=14 style=background:#dcdcdc; text-align:center| Defenders

|-
! colspan=14 style=background:#dcdcdc; text-align:center| Midfielders

|-
! colspan=14 style=background:#dcdcdc; text-align:center| Forwards

|-
! colspan=14 style=background:#dcdcdc; text-align:center| Players transferred out during the season

Goalscorers

Last updated: 19 May 2018

Clean sheets

Last updated: 19 May 2018

Disciplinary record

Last updated: 19 May 2018

References

Hellas Verona F.C. seasons
Hellas Verona